Rosemary Uwemedimo is a Nigerian writer of children's fiction of English origin.

Biography 

Uwemedimo was born Rosemary Howard.

She married a Nigerian barrister in the 1950s, the couple had at least one child.

Works
 Mammy-Wagon Marriage (1961)
 Akpan and the Smugglers (1971)

References

Possibly living people
Year of birth missing
20th-century Nigerian writers
20th-century Nigerian women writers